Hitt is an unincorporated community in Carroll County, Illinois, United States. Hitt is northeast of Milledgeville.

References

Unincorporated communities in Carroll County, Illinois
Unincorporated communities in Illinois